Sir Charles Vaughan (died 1630) was a Welsh landowner and politician who sat in the House of Commons in 1614 and 1625.

Vaughan was the eldest son of Sir Walter Vaughan of Dunraven, Glamorgan, Pembrey, Carmarthenshire, and Tealstone, Wiltshire. He was knighted on 7 November 1608.  In 1614, he was elected Member of Parliament for Breconshire. He was elected MP for Breconshire again in 1625.

Vaughan married firstly Frances Knollys daughter of Sir Robert Knollys and through her acquired the estate of Porthamel (or Porthamal) Breconshire. He married secondly Dorothy Miller daughter of Sir Robert Miller of Dorset. His only daughter Bridget married John Ashburnham, 1st Baron Ashburnham and took him the Porthamal estate.

References

Year of birth missing
1630 deaths
Members of the Parliament of England (pre-1707) for constituencies in Wales
People from Brecknockshire
English MPs 1614
English MPs 1625
17th-century Welsh politicians